Nizar ben Abdelaziz Trabelsi (born 2 July 1970) is a Tunisian former professional footballer. In 2003, he was convicted as terrorist and sentenced to ten years' imprisonment for his association with Al-Qaida, and for plotting to attack US targets including American soldiers stationed at the Belgian airbase Kleine Brogel Air Base.

Football career
Trabelsi played in Germany for Fortuna Düsseldorf, Wuppertaler SV, 1. FC Wülfrath, SV 09/35 Wermelskirchen and VfR Neuss, as a midfielder.

Association with Al-Qaida
Trabelsi had traveled to Afghanistan and met Osama bin Laden on several occasions. In 2001, Trabelsi was suspected of plotting to attack a US embassy in Paris, which was uncovered and stopped. He is said to be the designated suicide bomber, and was to wear a business suit to conceal the strapped bomb onto himself before walking into the embassy.

Trabelsi was arrested in an apartment, in Uccle near Brussels, Belgium on 13 September 2001. He was also implicated by Briton Saajid Badat, who alleged that both of them had conspired with Richard Reid supposedly to blow up two US-bound airliners using shoe bombs simultaneously.

Conviction
In 2003, Trabelsi was sentenced to a ten-year prison term in Belgium. He was also found guilty of illegal weapons possession and being a member in a private militia. On 3 October 2013, he was extradited to the United States. In September 2014, the European Court of Human Rights found that his deportation was performed in violation of Article 3 of the European Convention on Human Rights and ordered Belgium to pay 60,000 euros in damages to Trabelsi.

Trabelsi was extradited to the United States in October 2013, after he completed his sentence in Belgium.

, he remained in jail, in Washington D.C., awaiting trial.

References

Tunisian al-Qaeda members
Islamic terrorism in Belgium
Tunisian people imprisoned abroad
Prisoners and detainees of Belgium
Tunisian footballers
Fortuna Düsseldorf players
Wuppertaler SV players
Expatriate footballers in Germany
Tunisian expatriate footballers
Tunisian expatriate sportspeople in Germany
Association football midfielders
Tunisian expatriate sportspeople in Belgium
1970 births
Living people